All-Star Triangle Bowl (formerly All-Star Bowling Lane) is a bowling alley located in Orangeburg, South Carolina, United States. The lanes are a historic fixture of the community. The original owner was Harry K. Floyd. All-Star Triangle Bowl is most known for its fundamental role in the Orangeburg Massacre, which was sparked as a result of Floyd refusing to allow people of color to bowl at the privately owned bowling alley (which was then called All Star Bowling Lane). He owned and operated the alley until his death on July 12, 2002, following which his son, Harry K. Floyd, Jr., took over.

Due to financial difficulties, the Floyd family closed the bowling alley in August 2007. The All-Star Triangle Bowl remains on the National Register of Historic Places.

References

External links
All Star Bowling Lane page

Sports venues on the National Register of Historic Places in South Carolina
African-American history of South Carolina
Buildings and structures in Orangeburg County, South Carolina
Bowling alleys
Civil rights movement
National Register of Historic Places in Orangeburg County, South Carolina